Angela armata is a species of praying mantis from the genus Angela of the family Mantidae. Specimens can be found in regions of Brazil, Costa Rica, Ecuador, French Guiana and Peru.

References 

Mantidae
Insects described in 1842
Insects of South America